Dioecism, dioikismos, dioecismus,  can mean:

 Dioecism, the removal from a city of its formerly subordinate constituents, the opposite of synoecism
 Dioecism, the botanical condition of being dioecious, dioecy
 Dioecism, a type of biological sex allocation

See also
 Synoecism (disambiguation)